Eucalyptus melliodora, commonly known as yellow box, honey box or yellow ironbark, is a species of medium-sized to occasionally tall tree that is endemic to south-eastern, continental Australia. It has rough, flaky or fibrous bark on part or all of the trunk, smooth greyish to yellowish bark above. The adult leaves are lance-shaped to egg-shaped, the flower buds are arranged in groups of seven and the fruit is more or less hemispherical.

Description
The bark is variable ranging from smooth with an irregular, short stocking, to covering most of the trunk, fibrous, dense or loosely held, grey, yellow or red-brown, occasionally very coarse, thick, dark brown to black. The smooth bark above is shed from the upper limbs to leave a smooth, white or yellowish surface. The vein on the leaf margin of both adult and juvenile leaves is markedly distant from the leaf margin.

Flowering has been recorded in most months and the flowers are white.

Taxonomy
Eucalyptus melliodora was first formally described in 1843 by Johannes Conrad Schauer from an unpublished description by Allan Cunningham and the description was published in Walpers' book Repertorium Botanices Systematicae. The specific epithet (melliodora) is derived from the Latin words melleus meaning "honey" and odorus "scented".

Distribution and habitat
Yellow box is widely distributed on the eastern plains and tablelands from western Victoria, New South Wales and up from the capital territory to south-central Queensland.

Ecology
It is associated with inland grey box, fuzzy box (E. conica), white box (E. albens), pilliga grey box (E. pilligaensis), red ironbark (E. sideroxylon), narrow-leaved ironbark (E. crebra), Blakely's red gum (E. blakelyi), apple species (Angophora), black cypress (Callitris endlicheri), white cypress (Callitris glaucophylla), kurrajong (Brachychiton populneus) and wattles (Acacia) species.

Uses
Eucalyptus melliodora provides good firewood and hard, strong, durable timber. The honey produced from it is renowned for its quality.

Notable specimens
One of the few trees to survive the blast from the 6 August 1945 atomic bombing of Hiroshima Japan, was an E. melliodora.

Gallery

References

Further reading
 Bootle KR. (1983). Wood in Australia. Types, properties and uses. McGraw-Hill Book Company, Sydney. 

melliodora
Trees of Australia
Flora of the Australian Capital Territory
Flora of Victoria (Australia)
Flora of New South Wales
Flora of Queensland
Myrtales of Australia
Plants described in 1843
Drought-tolerant trees
Taxa named by Allan Cunningham (botanist)